Duncan MacGregor may refer to:

 Duncan MacGregor (academic) (1843–1906), New Zealand university professor, public servant and health administrator
 Duncan MacGregor (rugby union), Scottish rugby union player
 Duncan MacGregor (footballer) (born 1952), Australian rules footballer

See also
 Duncan McGregor (1881–1947), New Zealand rugby union player